Alexander Joshua Dexter (born November 3, 1998) is an American soccer player who currently plays as a left-winger.

Early life
Dexter was born in Brooklyn, New York, but moved to Germany at a young age, attending Kaiserslautern High School. Whilst in Germany, Dexter played with the FK Pirmasens academy.

College career
In 2017, Dexter returned to the United States to play college soccer at the University of Pittsburgh. In five years with the Panthers, including a truncated season in 2020 due to the COVID-19 pandemic, Dexter made 92 appearances, scoring 22 and goals and tallying 22 assists. He was named ACC All-Freshman Team in 2017 and  All-ACC Third Team in 2020.

While at college, Dexter played in the USL PDL for two seasons in both 2018 and 2019, making 16 appearances for the Long Island Rough Riders, scoring five goals.

Club career

Loudoun United
In May 2022, Dexter signed with USL Championship side Loudoun United, who he made three regular season appearances for, scoring one goal on May 28, 2022 against Charleston Battery.

Charleston Battery
On July 8, 2022, Dexter signed a short-term deal with Charleston Battery. On July 16, 2022, Dexter made his debut for Charleston during a 3-1 win against Hartford Athletic. On July 29, 2022, Charleston announced that they had extended Dexter's contract through the end of the 2022 season. Following the 2022 season, Dexter was released by Charleston.

References

1998 births
Living people
Association football forwards
American soccer players
Charleston Battery players
Expatriate footballers in Germany
FK Pirmasens players
Long Island Rough Riders players
Loudoun United FC players
Pittsburgh Panthers men's soccer players
Soccer players from New York (state)
USL Championship players
USL League Two players